Charles Wyatt Shields IV is an American biomedical engineer and assistant professor at the University of Colorado Boulder in the Department of Chemical and Biological Engineering. His research involves the rational design of colloidal and supracolloidal particles for applications in drug delivery and biosensing.

Education 
C. Wyatt Shields IV attended the University of Virginia and received a Bachelor of Science with High Distinction in Biomedical Engineering in 2011, performing undergraduate research with Jeffrey Saucerman and William Walker. He continued his career in research as a graduate student in Biomedical Engineering at Duke University for Gabriel López and obtained his PhD in 2016. During his PhD, Wyatt Shields studied magnetic and acoustic methods for isolation and analysis of cells.

Career 

Wyatt Shields performed postdoctoral research at North Carolina State University working with Orlin Velev and Stefan Zauscher in 2017 and at Harvard University with Samir Mitragotri in 2018. At Harvard's Wyss Institute, Shields developed cytokine-releasing macrophage "backpacks" that maintain a tumor-killing state in cells, travel to tumor sites, and slow their growth.

Wyatt Shields became an assistant professor at the University of Colorado Boulder in 2020 in chemical and biological engineering. He is also an affiliate professor in the biomedical engineering program and in the materials science and engineering program. Working at the intersection of materials, soft matter physics, and bioengineering, Shields focuses on understanding how stimuli-responsive particles behave in physiological settings and controlling their assembly and motion for biological applications. His lab has numerous clinical collaborations. Current research includes investigating the role of immune cells in decompression sickness using lung-on-a-chip devices, developing "bottom-up" multifunctional magnetic microrobots, and using acoustically responsive particles for capture and purification of disease biomarkers.

Shields' early career has been highly successful, with numerous high profile awards, 5 patents filed, and over 40 articles published in journals such as Science Advances, Advanced Materials, Advanced Functional Materials, and Journal of Controlled Release. Additionally, he is a Guest Associate Editor for the journal Bioengineering & Translational Medicine. 

Another hallmark of Shields' career is his commitment to scientific outreach and mentorship. For several years, his group has worked with a local high school to provide engineering problems related to the lab's work in drug delivery and biosensing, giving students the opportunity to design prototypes and work on real life engineering problems. Shields also was recognized for his  mentorship of students of diverse and underrepresented backgrounds in 2016 while working under Dr. Gabriel López.

Awards and honors 

In his third year at the University of Colorado Boulder, Shields received five distinguished research awards, including a National Science Foundation (NSF) CAREER award, Office of Naval Research (ONR) Young Investigator Program award, Pew Biomedical Scholars award, Packard Fellowship for Science and Engineering, and an NIH National Institute of General Medical Sciences (NIGMS) Maximizing Investigators' Research Award (MIRA). Shields is one of only 20 recipients of the prestigious Packard Fellowship at the University of Colorado Boulder.

Other awards and honors include:

 CU Boulder Lab Venture Challenge Awardee (2022)
 Outreach Partner of the Year, Northglenn High School (2022)
 Beckman Young Investigator Award Finalist (2022)
 NIH Exploratory/Developmental Research Grant Award (2021)
 Best On-Demand Talk by the Controlled Release Society (2020)
 Dean’s Award for Excellence in Mentoring, Duke University (2016)
 NSF Graduate Research Fellowship (2012)
 NSF Research Triangle MRSEC Fellowship (2011)

References 

Year of birth missing (living people)
Living people
American biomedical engineers
University of Colorado Boulder faculty
21st-century American engineers
University of Virginia alumni
Duke University alumni